Fast and Curious is the fourth studio album by American R&B recording artist Sy Smith, released on March 6, 2012 by Psyko! Records.

Recording and production
In April 2010, Smith confirmed that she was working on a new project and that she had already recorded a song called "Message from the Stars". She also stated her plans to release a project in the summer of 2010 which resulted in the release of the buzz single "Truth". In December 2010, Smith stated in another interview, "I’m working to finish this synthy '80s throwback dance record."

In September 2011, Smith appeared along Mark de Clive-Lowe on WGN-TV Midday News to perform her song "Personal Paradise". In December 2011, Smith announced the title of album to be Fast and Curious when she gave fans a chance to submit their "Fast" or "Curious" photo to be included in the cover art.

Release and promotion
A month before the release of the album, Smith uploaded the album to her account on soundcloud.com.  Smith offered autographed copies to fans that purchased the album through her website.

Singles
"Truth", featuring Mark de Clive-Lowe, was released on August 1, 2010, as the album's buzz single. A maxi-single EP was released to iTunes which included the music video that aired on YouTube the same day. "Teena (Lovergirl Syberized)" was released in January 2011, as a free digital song on Lowe's bandcamp website. On October 19, 2012, Smith released a music video for "Nights (Feel Like Getting Down)".

Critical response
Fast and Curious received a review from L. Michael Gipson of Creative Loafing Atlanta. Gipson gave the album a four star rating out of five stars.

Track listing
The track listing as confirmed by CD Baby.
"The Fast and The Curious"
"Truth"
"Personal Paradise"
"Find My Way"
"Nights (Feel Like Getting Down)" (featuring Rahsaan Patterson)
"Let The Rain Fall Down"
"Teena (Lovergirl Syberized)"
"The Oooh to my Aah"
"The Primacy Effect"
"Message from the Stars"
"People Of The Sun"

References

2012 albums
Sy Smith albums